Euxoa castanea is a moth of the family Noctuidae first described by J. Donald Lafontaine in 1981.

The wingspan is 35–38 mm. Adults are on wing from July to August. There is one generation per year.

References

Euxoa
Moths of North America
Moths described in 1981